Mary Stewart Cutting Jr. (1879 – February 11, 1928) was an American author and a suffragist.

Biography
Mary Stewart Cutting Jr. was the daughter of Charles Weed Cutting and the novelist Mary Stewart Cutting. Her maternal grandfather was the Civil War general Ulysses Doubleday (general); her maternal grandmother's birth name was Stewart. Because her name is the same as her mother's, and because the daughter survived her mother by only four years, the two women are frequently confused.

Mary Stewart Cutting Jr. was born in New Jersey, where she became a well-known suffragist.  She was also the author of magazine and newspaper articles. According to her New York Times obituary, she died on February 11, 1928, in Manhattan, New York City, after being ill for a month.

References

External links

 "Hunter Stalks Big Game For Museum," by Mary Stewart Cutting Jr., New York Times, Sept 20, 1925
"Toc H," Heritage of War, Breaks Down Class Lines," by Mary Stewart Cutting Jr., New York Times, March 8, 1925
 

1851 births
1928 deaths
American women journalists
American suffragists
20th-century American non-fiction writers
American newspaper journalists
American magazine journalists
20th-century American women writers